The tennis racket theorem or intermediate axis theorem is a result in classical mechanics describing the movement of a rigid body with three distinct principal moments of inertia.  It is also dubbed the Dzhanibekov effect, after Soviet cosmonaut Vladimir Dzhanibekov who noticed one of the theorem's logical consequences while in space in 1985, although the effect was already known for at least 150 years before that and was included in a book by Louis Poinsot in 1834.

The theorem describes the following effect: rotation of an object around its first and third principal axes is stable, while rotation around its second principal axis (or intermediate axis) is not.

This can be demonstrated with the following experiment: hold a tennis racket at its handle, with its face being horizontal, and try to throw it in the air so that it will perform a full rotation around the horizontal axis perpendicular to the handle, and try to catch the handle. In almost all cases, during that rotation the face will also have completed a half rotation, so that the other face is now up. By contrast, it is easy to throw the racket so that it will rotate around the handle axis (ê1 in the diagram) without accompanying half-rotation around another axis; it is also possible to make it rotate around the vertical axis perpendicular to the handle (ê3) without any accompanying half-rotation.

The experiment can be performed with any object that has three different moments of inertia, for instance with a book, remote control, or smartphone. The effect occurs whenever the axis of rotation differs only slightly from the object's second principal axis; air resistance or gravity are not necessary.

Theory 

The tennis racket theorem can be qualitatively analysed with the help of Euler's equations.
Under torque–free conditions, they take the following form:

Here  denote the object's principal moments of inertia, and we assume .

Stable rotation around the first and third principal axis 
Consider the situation when the object is rotating around axis with moment of inertia . To determine the nature of equilibrium, assume small initial angular velocities along the other two axes. As a result, according to equation (1),  is very small. Therefore, the time dependence of  may be neglected.

Now, differentiating equation (2) and substituting  from equation (3),

Note that  is being opposed and so rotation around this axis is stable for the object.

Similar reasoning gives that rotation around axis with moment of inertia  is also stable.

Unstable rotation around the second principal axis 
Now apply the same analysis to axis with moment of inertia  This time  is very small. Therefore, the time dependence of  may be neglected.

Now, differentiating equation (1) and substituting  from equation (3),

Note that  is not opposed (and therefore will grow) and so rotation around the second axis is unstable. Therefore, even a small disturbance along other axes causes the object to 'flip'.

See also

References

External links
 
  on Mir International Space Station
 
Louis Poinsot, Théorie nouvelle de la rotation des corps, Paris, Bachelier, 1834, 170 p.  : historically, the first mathematical description of this effect.
 - intuitive video explanation by Matt Parker

Classical mechanics
Physics theorems
Juggling